A list of films produced in France in 1975.

See also
1975 in France

Notes

External links
 French films of 1975 at the Internet Movie Database
French films of 1975 at Cinema-francais.fr

1975
Lists of 1975 films by country or language
Films